Hubert Maitland Turnbull FRS (3 March 1875, Glasgow – 29 September 1955) was a British pathologist.

Hubert Turnbull's father was the manager and actuary of the Scottish Widows Fund and Life Assurance Society and his mother was a daughter of the publisher Adam Black. After education at St Ninian's School, Moffat from 1884 to 1888 and at Charterhouse School from 1888 to 1894, Hubert Turnbull matriculated in 1894 at Magdalen College, Oxford, where he graduated B.A. (Oxon.) in 1898. He pursued graduate study at Oxford and in 1899 received Oxford's Hugh Russell Welsh prize for the study of human anatomy and the art of drawing in relation thereto. In 1900 he began further study of medicine at the London Hospital and in 1902 received there M.B., B.Chir. (Oxon.). In 1902 he also received M.A. (Oxon.) and qualified M.R.C.S. and L.R.C.P. From February to June 1903, he was a house physician at London Hospital but, due to illness, from June to November was unable to work. From November 1903 to July 1904, Turnbull worked at the London Hospital's Institute of Pathology and then studied at Copenhagen and Dresden as a recipient of Oxford's Radcliffe Travelling Fellowship in Medical Sciences. At Dresden he was a voluntary assistant to Georg Schmorl. From 1906 to 1946 Turnbull was the director of London Hospital's Institute of Pathology. At London University he became in 1915 reader in morbid anatomy, in 1915 professor, and in 1947 professor emeritus. In 1924 he became M.R.C.P. At London Hospital's Institute of Pathology he established an outstanding department with a high standard of accuracy in biopsies and necropsies.

In 1916 Turnbull married Catherine Nairne Arnold-Baker, the younger daughter of Frederick Arnold-Baker. The marriage produced four children one of them Lieutenant Commander Frederick Richard Arnold Turnbull of the Operation Crimson.

Awards and honours
1929 — Fellow of the Royal College of Physicians
1939 — F.R.S.

Selected publications
with Theodore Thompson:  (Plate 15 at end of article)

with James McIntosh: 
with James McIntosh: 
with Donald Hunter: 
with Mathew Young: 
with Otto Leyton & Allen B. Bratton: 
 with J. Preston Maxwell & Cheng Hsiang Hu (程胡襄): 
with W. Russell Brain:

References

1875 births
1955 deaths
Alumni of Magdalen College, Oxford
British pathologists
Fellows of the Royal Society
People educated at Charterhouse School
People educated at St Ninian's School, Moffat